Desmond Frost  (3 August 1926 – 3 June 1993) was an English professional footballer who scored 74 goals from 187 appearances in the Football League playing as a centre forward for Leeds United, Halifax Town, Rochdale and Crewe Alexandra. He also played non-league football for Civil Defence Messengers and Congleton Town either side of war service in the Northamptonshire Regiment and the Royal Army Service Corps. Frost was born in Congleton, Cheshire, in 1926 and died in Cheshire in 1993 at the age of 66.

References

1926 births
1993 deaths
People from Congleton
English footballers
Association football forwards
Congleton Town F.C. players
Leeds United F.C. players
Halifax Town A.F.C. players
Rochdale A.F.C. players
Crewe Alexandra F.C. players
English Football League players
Northamptonshire Regiment soldiers
Royal Army Service Corps soldiers
British Army personnel of World War II